National Highway 716G (NH 716G) is a national highway in India, that run in state of Andhra Pradesh. The eastern terminus is at NH 716 in Muddanur, a small town in Kadapa district. The western terminus is at NH 544E near Hindupur. This national highway is a merge of two state highways which  originated from the same city, Kadiri. These state highways were State Highways 60 (SH 60, the Kadiri–Jammalamadugu Road) and SH 61 (the Kadiri–Hindupur Road).

Route 
It passes through Pulivendula, Kadiri (junction with NH 42), ObulaDevaraCheruvu, Gorantla, Palasamudram

Junctions 

 terminus near Muddanur
 near Kadiri
 terminal near Hindupur

Construction 
Widening of existing road to four-lane from Muddanur to B. Kothapalli section of NH 716G in the State of Andhra Pradesh has been sanctioned with budget of ₹ 1080.91 crore.

Widening and reconstruction of existing road to four-lane from B. Kothapalli junction to Gorantla (excluding Kadiri Bypass) of NH 716G (Muddanuru–Hindupur), in the state of Andhra Pradesh has been sanctioned with budget of ₹ 839.98 crore.

References 

National highways in India